Cheerleader Ninjas is a 2002 camp/action film directed by Kevin Campbell, starring actress Kira Reed, and from production company Control Track Productions. It predates the similarly named George Takei comedic vehicle Ninja Cheerleaders. In the film, the internet must be rescued from the control of a religious fanaticism group by four cheerleader ninjutsu students and their geek allies. The movie was filmed at Englewood High School.

Plot overview

Four cheerleaders from the Happy Valley High Hamsters are blamed by a group of Church Ladies for the invasion of "Internet smut" into their children's bedrooms. The Church Ladies hire Stephen, a gay teacher from the local Parochial Reform School, to teach the cheerleaders a lesson by training a group of evil Catholic school girls.

In the other side, Mr. X, an evil mastermind is using the cheerleaders as guinea pigs to test his Internet Zombie Domination software. So the cheerleaders turn to their arch social enemies, the computer geeks, to help them learn Ninja abilities and defeat the evil Catholic Girls, Stephen and the mysterious Mr. X.

Reception
Film Threat gave the film four stars, stating that the performances were "quite good, especially for the subject matter we’re dealing with".  The encyclopedia of underground movies found it more gory than funny.

Remake
It was remade as Ninja Cheerleaders starring George Takei.

References

External links

American independent films
Cheerleading films
2002 films
Ninja films
2002 comedy films
American martial arts comedy films
2002 martial arts films
2000s English-language films
2000s American films